Tilghman may refer to:

People
 Tilghman (surname), a surname and a list of people with the surname
 Tilghman Howard (1797–1844), American politician
 Tilghman Tucker (1802–1859), American politician, governor of Mississippi from 1842 to 1844

Other uses
Tilghman Island, Maryland, United States, an island
Paducah Tilghman High School, Paducah, Kentucky, United States

See also